El-Sayed Abdel Hamid Mobarak (born 17 April 1947) is an Egyptian basketball player. He competed in the 1972 Summer Olympics.

References

1947 births
Living people
Basketball players at the 1972 Summer Olympics
Egyptian men's basketball players
1970 FIBA World Championship players
Olympic basketball players of Egypt